Refugees of the Libyan Civil War are the people, predominantly Libyans, who fled or were expelled from their homes during the First Libyan Civil War (2011), from within the borders of Libya to the neighbouring states of Tunisia, Egypt and Chad, as well as to European countries across the Mediterranean. The majority of Libyan refugees are Arab-Berbers, though many of the other ethnicities temporarily living in Libya originated from sub-Saharan Africa. These groups were also among the first refugee waves to exit the country. The total number of Libyan refugees were estimated at around one million as of June 2011 and most returned after the First Civil War ended. As of January 2013, there were 5,252 refugees originating from Libya alongside 59,425 internally displaced persons registered by the UNHCR.

According to a Le Monde article dated 13 May 2014, there were between 600,000 and 1,000,000 Libyan refugees in Tunisia, many of which were political opponents of the present forces in power in Libya, and many of which are supporters of the Jamahiriya of Muammar Gaddafi. This represented between 10 and 15% of the population of Libya prior to the NATO intervention.

According to journalist Barbara Slavin, reporting for Al Monitor on 5 August 2014, Tunisian President Moncef Marzouki stated that two million Libyans, or one third of the pre NATO intervention population of Libya, have taken refuge in Tunisia.

History

Exodus
Fleeing the violence of Tripoli by road, as many as 4,000 refugees were crossing the Libya–Tunisia border daily during the first days of the 2011 civil war. Among those escaping the violence were native Libyans as well as foreign nationals including Egyptians, Tunisians and Turks.

By 1 March 2011, officials from the UN High Commissioner for Refugees had confirmed allegations of discrimination against sub-Saharan Africans who were held in dangerous conditions in the no-man's-land between Tunisia and Libya. On 10 May 2011, The Week posted an article claiming that roughly 746,000 people have fled Libya since the war began.

A provisional refugee camp was set up at Ras Ajdir on the Libyan-Tunisian border and had a capacity for 10,000, but was overflowing with an estimated 20,000 to 30,000 refugees. By 3 March 2011, the situation there was described as a logistical nightmare, with the World Health Organization warning of the risk of epidemics. To continue responding to the needs of people staying at the Ras Ajdir crossing point in Tunisia, the WFP and Secours Islamique-France upgraded a kitchen that would provide breakfast for families. Separately, the ICRC advised it was handing over its operations at the Choucha Camp to the Tunisian Red Crescent. Since 24 March 2011, the WFP supplied over 42,500 cooked meals for TCNs at the Sallum border. A total of 1,650 cartons of fortified date bars (equivalent of 13.2 metric tons) had also been provided to supplement these meals.

Over 500 mostly Berber Libyans fled their homes in Libya's Nafusa Mountains and took shelter in the Dehiba area of southeastern Tunisia between 5 and 12 April 2011.

The Sunday Telegraph reported on 11 September that almost the entire population of Tawergha, a town of about 10,000 people, had been forced to flee their homes by anti-Gaddafi fighters after their takeover of the settlement. The report suggested that Tawergha, which was dominated by black Libyans, may have been the subject of an ethnic cleansing provoked by a combination of racism and bitterness on the part of Misratan fighters over the Tawergha's support for Gaddafi during the siege of Misrata.

On 1 October 2011, Red Cross official Abdelhamid al-Mendi said that more than 50,000 Libyans had fled their homes in Benghazi since the war began in February.

After 2011 war
As of January 2013, there were 5,252 refugees originating from Libya alongside 59,425 internally displaced persons. However the Le Monde article of 14 May 2014 stated that "Estimates of their numbers vary between 600,000 and one million by the Tunisian Ministry of Interior. If we add those, many also settled in Egypt, they would be nearly two million Libyans today outside the borders of a total population estimated at just over six million inhabitants."

According to journalist Barbara Slavin, reporting for Al Monitor on 5 August 2014, Tunisian President Moncef Marzouki stated that two million Libyans, or one third of the pre NATO intervention population of Libya, have taken refuge in Tunisia.

Benghazi is the area that hosts the largest share of identified IDPs, with 115,000 IDPs residing there, which as a group account for (27.6%) of all IDPs in Libya. It is followed by Ajdabiya with 31,750 of IDPs (7.6%), Bayda with 21,500 IDPs (5.2%), Abu Salim with 21,475 IDPs (5.1%), Bani Waled with 20,000 IDPs (4.8%), Alzintan with 19,425 IDPs (4.7%), Tobruk with 16,375 (3.9%), Al Ajaylat with 13,500 IDPs (3.2%), Janzour with 10,105 IDP (2.4%), Sabha with 7,215 (1.7%), and Tarhuna with 7,150 IDPs (1.7%). Combined, these 10 locations account for 67.9% of the total identified IDP population. The 31 areas shown in the table below jointly host 87.1 % of the total identified IDP population.

Immigration to Europe

Following the 2011 revolution in Tunisia and the civil war in Libya, in February, Italian Foreign Minister Frattini expressed his concerns that the amount of Libyan refugees trying to reach Italy might reach between 200,000 and 300,000 people. More than 45,000 refugees arrived on Lampedusa in the first five months of 2011.

See also
Humanitarian situation during the 2011 Libyan Civil War
Refugees of the Syrian Civil War

References

Libyan Crisis (2011–present)
Libyan diaspora
Forced migration
Demographics of Libya
Migrants of the European migrant crisis
Libyan Civil War